Severna Park is a census-designated place in Maryland, United States.

Severna Park can also refer to:
Severna Park (writer), an American science-fiction author
Severna Park Mall
Severna Park High School
Severna Park Elementary School and Severna Park Middle School, Anne Arundel County Public Schools